Steele Brook is a river in Delaware County, New York. It flows into the West Branch Delaware River by Delhi. Steele Brook flows through Delhi Reservoir.

References

Rivers of New York (state)
Rivers of Delaware County, New York
Tributaries of the West Branch Delaware River